The Saltrio Formation is a geological formation in Italy. It dates back to the middle Sinemurian, and would have represented a pelagic or near-epicontinental environment, judging by the presence of marine fauna such as the nautiloid Cenoceras. The Fossils of the Formation were described on the late 1880s and revised on 1960s, finding first marine biota, such as Crinoids, Bivalves and other fauna related to Epicontinental basin deposits.

Environment 
Since the beginning of the jurassic, from Hettangian to earliest Sinemurian on the western Lombardy Basin there was a notorious continental area that was found to be wider than previously thought, where a warm humid paleoclimate developed. The Dinosaur Fossils found on the Saltrio formation can have been translated from this area, or alternatively, the Arbostora swell (that was located at the north of the Saltrio formation, on Switzerland). This was an emerged structural high close to the Saltrio Formation, that caused a division between two near subsiding basins located at Mt. Nudo (East) and Mt. Generoso (West). It settled over a carbonate platform linked with other wider areas that appear along the west to the southeast, developing a large shallow water gulf to the north, where the strata deposited was controlled by a horst and tectonic gaben.
Several outcrops of the so-called “terra rossa” paleosoils were also found, including at Castello Cabiaglio-Orino, a dozen of kilometers West of Saltrio. This outcrops show that the emerged areas that on the Hettangian-Sinemurian, the current location of the modern Maggiore Lake were covered with forests, what was proven by the presence of large plant fragments on the Moltrasio Formation. The plants have been recovered between the locations of Cellina and Arolo (eastern side of Lake Maggiore), from rocks that have been found to be coeval in age to the Saltrio Formation. The Flora includes genera such as Bennettitales (Ptilophyllum), terrestrial Araucariaceae (Pagiophyllum), and Cheirolepidiaceae (Brachyphyllum), that developed on inland areas with dry-warm conditions.

The ammonites from the Saltrio Formation allow the formation to be dated to the Early Sinemurian. Animals probably lived in emerged parts of carbonated platform or an area to the northwest, whose presence had never been established. In the early Sinemurian, the Arbostora swell became again a shallow open sea (ramp-slope), still surrounded South and South-West by emerged land. The dinosaur bones where washed on this period, flowed into a gulf of the Mt. Nudo basin, where they became fossilized. The latter possibility was suggested by Lualdi (1999), in which he analyzed the local geology based on the presence of terrestrial plants and terrigenous content (sands from igneous or metamorphic rocks exposed to sub-aerial erosion) in the limestones. Terrestrial plants are essentially represented by leaves and small branches of Araucariaceans and Bennettitales, the typical flora of the early Mesozoic. However, plants and sand (which are not abundantly referred) can be carried by wind and ocean currents. Also, according to the most current paleogeographic maps, truly continental land located closer these Jurassic times lower were the Mountains of Sardinia, Corsica, distanced many tens of kilometers WNW.
Fossil footprints and tracks are preserved in tidal carbonates deposited in a relatively narrow carbonated platform in Trento, flanked to the east and west by relatively deep marine basins. Large theropods could not live in an atoll, since large areas had to be emersed to provide food and fresh water, and their herbivorous prey needed land with vegetation. The presence of vulcanodontids, cetiosaurs, primitive sauropods, heterodontosaurids, and scelidosaurs have been reported from the Calcari Grigi Group.

"It is more likely that the Peri-Adriatic Platforms worked with temporary continental bridges that connected with Laurasia Gondwana in central Tethis, allowing migration between the two hemispheres and colonization of local coastal habitats." "During the marine transgressions, some of these lands were isolated, implicating genetic Mutations in their terrestrial faunas, with typical biological consequences, as endemism and possible dwarfism".

Invertebrate fauna

Brachiopoda

Bivalves

Gastropods

Cephalopoda

Echinoderms

Vertebrate fauna

Fish

Icthyosaurs

Pterosaurs

Dinosaurs 

In 2016 new vertebrate remains were discovered in the Salnova quarry, the remains are being studied to understand if it is a new dinosaur or some other creature.

See also 
 List of fossiliferous stratigraphic units in Italy
 List of dinosaur-bearing rock formations

References

Further reading 
 F. M. Dalla Vecchia. 2001. Terrestrial ecosystems on the Mesozoic peri-Adriatic carbonate platforms: the vertebrate evidence. VII International Symposium on Mesozoic Terrestrial Ecosystems. Asociación Paleontología Argentina, Publicación Especial 7:77-83

Geologic formations of Italy
Jurassic System of Europe
Early Jurassic Europe
Sinemurian Stage
Limestone formations
Paleontology in Italy
Geography of Lombardy